Benzie County is a county in the U.S. state of Michigan. As of the 2020 Census, the population was 17,970.  The county seat is Beulah. The county was initially set off in 1863 and organized in 1869. At 321 square miles (831 km2), Benzie County is the smallest of the 83 counties in Michigan in terms of land area.

Benzie County is part of the Traverse City micropolitan area. Part of the Sleeping Bear Dunes National Lakeshore is located within the county. It is also home to Crystal Mountain, one of Michigan's top-rated ski resorts.

History 
Today's Benzie County was originally part of Leelanau County. Leelanau County was separated from Michilimackinac County in 1840, and was attached to Grand Traverse County. In 1863, The northern section of Leelanau County was organized, and the southern section, now named Benzie County, was left attached to Grand Traverse County. Benzie County was organized in its own right in 1869.

Etymology 
The name "Benzie" is derived from the French , "the river of sawbills", bec-scie ("bill-saw") being a type of ducks. Americans altered the pronunciation of the river's name, which became known as the "Betsie River". A similar alteration in pronunciation produced "Benzie".

Geography
It is the smallest county in Michigan by land area.

Benzie County is located in the northwest of the Lower Peninsula, in the "little finger" position of the mitten-shaped peninsula and is considered to be part of the Northern Michigan region.  Lake Michigan is to the west, Leelanau County and the Leelanau Peninsula are to the north. Grand Traverse County and Traverse City are to the east. Wexford County is to the southeast and Manistee County to the south. The Sleeping Bear Dunes National Lakeshore extends into the northwest portion of the county. Crystal Lake is a prominent physical feature of the area. The Platte River rises out of a lake district around Lake Ann in the northeast of the county and flows southwest and the northwest into Big Platte Lake before emptying into Lake Michigan at Platte River Point. The Betsie River rises in neighboring Grand Traverse County, flowing southwest across the southeast corner of the county into Manistee County, where it bends northwest until just south of Benzonia where it receives the outflow of Crystal Lake and then flows mostly west through Elberta and Frankfort and into Lake Michigan.

Portions of the Pere Marquette State Forest lie within the county and offer several trails including a  route along the Betsie River and a  trail near Lake Ann. There are state forest campgrounds at Platte River and Lake Ann. The Betsie River State Game Area is located just east of Elberta.  of the Betsie River is a state-designated Natural River from Grass Lake, just west of the Grand Traverse County line, to its inlet into Lake Betsie just east of Elberta. The natural and scenic richness of the area has made it a host to a variety of conservation, education, and recreation programs, including Crystalaire, the Grand Traverse Regional Land Conservancy, and others.

Major highways
  enters the county from the south, passes through Benzonia and Beulah on the south end of Crystal Lake before turning to exit the county to the east.
  traverses the western edge of the county, providing a scenic drive along the shore of Lake Michigan.
  enters the county from the south, angling northwest, and merges with US 31 for a couple of miles until Benzonia where M-115 continues west to end in Frankfort.
Previously, an additional highway, M-168, ran in the village of Elberta, serving the former Ann Arbor Railroad ferry docks. The route was handed back to local control in 2012.

Adjacent counties
By land
 Leelanau County - north
 Grand Traverse County - east
 Manistee County - south
 Wexford County - adjacent at the southeast corner

By water
 Door County, Wisconsin - northwest across Lake Michigan
 Kewaunee County, Wisconsin - southwest across Lake Michigan

Demographics

As of the 2000 census, there were 15,998 people, 6,500 households, and 4,595 families residing in the county. There were 10,312 housing units at an average density of 32 per square mile (12/km2). The racial makeup of the county was 96.39% White, 0.28% Black or African American, 1.59% Native American, 0.16% Asian, 0.01% Pacific Islander, 0.39% from other races, and 1.19% from two or more races.  1.46% of the population were Hispanic or Latino of any race. 24.0% were of German, 13.5% Polish, 9.2% Irish, 7.6% American, 6.0% British and 5.0% French ancestry. 96.8% spoke English and 1.9% Spanish as a first language.

There were 6,500 households, out of which 28.8% had children under the age of 18 living with them, 59.2% were married couples living together, 7.7% had a female householder with no husband present, and 29.30% were non-families. 24.1% of all households were made up of individuals, and 10.80% had someone living alone who was 65 years of age or older.  The average household size was 2.42 and the average family size was 2.86.

In the county, the population was spread out, with 23.4% under the age of 18, 6.2% from 18 to 24, 27.1% from 25 to 44, 25.8% from 45 to 64, and 17.5% who were 65 years of age or older.  The median age was 41 years. For every 100 females, there were 98.1 males.  For every 100 females age 18 and over, there were 96.4 males.

The median income for a household in the county was $37,350, and the median income for a family was $42,716. Males had a median income of $30,218 versus $21,730 for females. The per capita income for the county was $18,524.  About 4.7% of families and 7.0% of the population were below the poverty line, including 8.2% of those under age 18 and 5.2% of those age 65 or over.

Religion
 Benzie County is part of the Roman Catholic Diocese of Gaylord.

Government
For most of its history, Benzie County has primarily supported Republican presidential candidates, with the only times they failed to carry to the county prior to 1992 being in 1912 & 1964. Starting with the 1992 election, the county has become more of a swing county, with 2012 and 2020 being the only two presidential elections it did not vote for the national winner from 1980 on as of 2020.

The county government operates the jail, maintains rural roads, operates the major local courts,
keeps files of deeds and mortgages, maintains vital records, administers public health regulations, and
participates with the state in the provision of welfare and other social services. The county board of commissioners controls the budget but has only limited authority to make laws or ordinances.  In
Michigan, most local government functions — police and fire, building and zoning, tax assessment, street
maintenance, etc. — are the responsibility of individual cities and townships.

Elected officials
 Prosecuting Attorney: Sara Swanson
 Sheriff: Kyle Rosa
 County Clerk: Dawn Olney
 County Treasurer: Michelle L. Thompson
 Register of Deeds: Amy Bissell
 Drain Commissioner: Edward Hoogterp
 County Surveyor: John Smendzuik

(information as of September 2005)

Historic locations
There are eight historical markers in the County:
 Benzonia College
 Benzonia Congregational Church
 Bruce Catton
 Car Ferries on Lake Michigan
 Joyfield Cemetery
 Marquette's Death
 Mills Community House
 Pacific Salmon

Communities

City
 Frankfort

Villages
 Benzonia
 Beulah (county seat)
 Elberta
 Honor
 Lake Ann
 Thompsonville

Census-designated places
 Bendon
 Crystal Downs Country Club
 Crystal Mountain
 Hardwood Acres
 Maple Grove
 Nessen City
 Pilgrim

Townships

 Almira Township
 Benzonia Township
 Blaine Township
 Colfax Township
 Crystal Lake Township
 Gilmore Township
 Homestead Township
 Inland Township
 Joyfield Township
 Lake Township
 Platte Township
 Weldon Township

Indian reservations
 The Grand Traverse Indian Reservation, which has territory in five counties, occupies a small area in southern Joyfield Township in Benzie County.

Ghost towns

 Allyn Station (Pratts)
 Almira
 Aral
 Cedar Run
 Edgewater
 Gilmore
 Grant House (Homestead)
 Homestead
 Inland
 Joyfield
 Kentville
 Melva
 Osborn
 Oviat
 Platte
 Playtte River (Melva)
 Pratts
 Stormer
 Success (Ransom Creek)
 Wallin
 Weldon

Source:

See also
 List of Michigan State Historic Sites in Benzie County, Michigan
 National Register of Historic Places listings in Benzie County, Michigan
 USS Benzie County (LST-266)
 Benzie Central Schools
 Benzie Central High School

References

Further reading
 
 A history of Herring Lake: with an introductory legend, The bride of mystery

External links
 Benzie Area Visitors Bureau
 Benzie County Chamber of Commerce
 Benzie County official website

 
Michigan counties
Traverse City micropolitan area
1869 establishments in Michigan
Populated places established in 1869